The Ventures a Go-Go is the seventeenth studio album by the band The Ventures; released in 1965 on Dolton Records BST 8037 (stereo) and BLP 2037 (monaural). It consists mostly of instrumental covers of popular tunes from the late 50s and early 60s, with a few original compositions. It was on the charts for 35 weeks and it peaked at #16 on the Billboard 200. This album was the fourth highest charting album that The Ventures released.

Track listing

Side one
"(I Can't Get No) Satisfaction" (Mick Jagger, Keith Richards) – 2:25 
 "Go-Go Slow" (Bob Bogle, Nokie Edwards, Mel Taylor, Don Wilson) – 2:10
"Louie Louie" (Richard Berry) – 2:10 
"Night Stick" (Bogle, Edwards, Taylor, Wilson) –2:00 
"La Bamba" (Traditional) – 2:25 
"The "In" Crowd" (Billy Page) – 2:19

Side two
"Wooly Bully" (Domingo "Sam" Samudio) – 2:20 
"A Go-Go Guitar" (Bogle, Edwards, Taylor, Wilson) – 2:15   
"A Go-Go Dancer" (Bogle, Edwards, Taylor, Wilson) – 2:10 
"The Swingin' Creeper" (Bogle, Edwards, Taylor, Wilson) – 2:37 
"Whittier Blvd." (James Espinoza, Willie Garcia) – 2:20
"I Like It Like That" (Chris Kenner) – 2:20

Personnel

Ventures
Don Wilson – rhythm and lead guitar
Nokie Edwards – lead guitar 
Bob Bogle – bass , lead guitar
Mel Taylor – drums

Technical
 Joe Saraceno – producer
 Bruce Botnick – engineer

References

1965 albums
Dolton Records albums
The Ventures albums
Instrumental albums